The 14th National Film Awards, then known as State Awards for Films, presented by Ministry of Information and Broadcasting, India to felicitate the best of Indian Cinema released in 1966. The awards were presented on 10 October 1967 at the Vigyan Bhavan in New Delhi.

Awards 

Awards were divided into feature films and non-feature films.

President's Gold Medal for the All India Best Feature Film is now better known as National Film Award for Best Feature Film, whereas President's Gold Medal for the Best Documentary Film is analogous to today's National Film Award for Best Non-Feature Film. For children's films, Prime Minister's Gold Medal is now given as National Film Award for Best Children's Film. At the regional level, President's Silver Medal for Best Feature Film is now given as National Film Award for Best Feature Film in a particular language. Certificate of Merit in all the categories is discontinued over the years.

Feature films 
Feature films were awarded at All India as well as regional level.

All India Award

Regional Award 

The awards were given to the best films made in the regional languages of India.

Non-feature films 

Non-feature film awards were given for the documentaries, educational films and film strips made in the country. For the 13th National Film Awards, no award was given in the filmstrip category and only Certificate of Merit was awarded for Educational Films. Following were the awards given for the non-feature films category:

Documentaries

Educational films

Awards not given 
Following were the awards not given as no film was found to be suitable for the award:
 President's Silver Medal for Best Feature Film in English
 President's Silver Medal for Best Feature Film in Punjabi

References

External Links 
 National Film Awards Archives
 Official Page for Directorate of Film Festivals, India

National Film Awards (India) ceremonies
1967 film awards
1967 in Indian cinema